Banebdjedet (Banebdjed) was an ancient Egyptian ram god with a cult centre at Mendes. Khnum was the equivalent god in Upper Egypt.

Family
His wife was the goddess Hatmehit ("Foremost of the Fishes"), who was perhaps the original deity of Mendes. Their offspring was "Horus the Child" and they formed the so-called "Mendesian Triad".

Etymology
The words for "ram" and "soul" sounded the same in Egyptian, so ram deities were at times regarded as appearances of other gods.

Image
Typically, the horned god Banebdjedet was depicted with four rams' heads to represent the four Bas of the sun god. He may also be linked to the first four gods to rule over Egypt (Osiris, Geb, Shu and Ra-Atum), with large granite shrines to each in the Mendes sanctuary.

Accounts
The Book of the Heavenly Cow describes the "Ram of Mendes" as being the Ba of Osiris, but this was not an exclusive association. A story dated to the New Kingdom describes him as being consulted by the "Divine Tribunal" to judge between Horus and Seth, but he proposes that Neith do it instead as an act of diplomacy. As the dispute continues, it is Banebdjedet who suggests that Seth be given the throne as he is the elder brother.

In a chapel in the Ramesseum, a stela records how the god Ptah took the form of Banebdjedet, in view of gaining his virility, in order to have union with the woman who would conceive Rameses II.

Gallery

Notes

External links 
 

Egyptian gods
Fertility gods
Horned deities
Osiris
Mythological caprids